Jacob Soulliere (born in Sofia, Bulgaria) is a baritone opera singer.

Career 
Soulliere began his early choral singing as a member of the Phoenix Boys Choir. Singing at Arizona's Music Fest Young Musicians Vocal Competition, Soulliere was asked by American composer, conductor, and lecturer, Z. Randall Stroope to sing the written solo in the choral piece and being selected to sing at the White House.

In December 2016 Soulliere was selected to perform with the newly formed Messiah Chorus in the production of Handel's Messiah under the direction of 4-time Grammy winner Vance George, formerly director of the San Francisco Symphony Chorus.

Soulliere participates as a choir member and as a soloist at Christ the Lord Lutheran Church in Carefree, Arizona. He currently studies voice with mezzo-soprano Mary Sue Hyatt, who formerly served as professor of voice at Kent State University.

Awards and recognitions 
Soulliere was being named "one of Arizona's finest young musicians".

Soulliere was the only vocalist selected to perform at the Musical Instrument Museum in 2016.

In 2017 and 2018, Soulliere placed 1st for two consecutive years in the Cheryl Siebs Memorial Vocal Competition.

Soulliere received the $500 scholarship and performed as the featured soloist at the Desert Hills Presbyterian Church as a part of the award. Most recently, Soulliere was a finalist for the Herberger Theater “young artist competition”

References

External links

Living people
Year of birth missing (living people)
Musicians from Arizona
21st-century Bulgarian male opera singers
Operatic baritones